Jagur was a town in ancient Israel. Jagur was located in the southernmost district of Judah (Josh. 15:21). It falls under the jurisdiction of the Mateh Yehuda Regional Council.

References

Hebrew Bible cities